Banksia borealis subsp. borealis is a subspecies of Banksia borealis. As an autonym, it is defined as encompassing the type material of the species. It was known as Dryandra borealis subsp. borealis until 2007, when Austin Mast and Kevin Thiele sunk all Dryandra into Banksia. As with other members of Banksia ser. Dryandra, it is endemic to the South West Botanical Province of Western Australia.

References

Further reading
 
 
 
 

borealis subsp. borealis
Plant subspecies
Endemic flora of Western Australia
Eudicots of Western Australia